Alexander or Alex Bryce may refer to:

 Alexander Bryce (minister) (1713–1786), Church of Scotland minister, mathematician, astronomer, scientist and poet 
 Sir Alexander Bryce (British Army officer) (1766–1832), British Army general
 Alexander Bryce (physician) (1863–1942), British physician and dietician
 Alex Bryce (1905–1961), British screenwriter, cinematographer and film director
 Alex Bryce (footballer) (born 1944), Scottish footballer

See also
 Alexander Bruce (disambiguation)